The 2004 Karl Schäfer Memorial (also known as the Vienna Cup) took place from October 13 through 16th, 2004. Skaters competed in the disciplines of men's singles and ladies' singles.

Results

Men

Ladies

External links
 results

Karl Schäfer Memorial
Karl Schafer Memorial, 2004
Karl Schafer Memorial, 2004